Kochuveli Lokmanya Tilak Terminus Garib Rath Express is a Superfast Express express train of the Garib Rath Express category belonging to Indian Railways - Southern Railway zone that runs between Kochuveli and Lokmanya Tilak Terminus in India.

Coaches

The 12202 / 01 Kochuveli Lokmanya Tilak Terminus Garib Rath Express presently has 11 AC 3 tier & 2 AC Chair Car coaches.

It does not have a Pantry car coach.

As is customary with most train services in India, Coach Composition may be amended at the discretion of Indian Railways depending on demand.

 GL Consists of Generator Van
 J Consists of AC Chair Car
 G Consists of AC 3 tier

Service
The 12202 / 01 Kochuveli Lokmanya Tilak Terminus Garib Rath Express covers the distance of 1812 kilometres in 26 hours 21 mins as 12202 Kochuveli Lokmanya Tilak Terminus Garib Rath Express& in 27 hours 40 mins as 12201 Lokmanya Tilak Terminus Kochuveli Garib Rath Express.

During Monsoon, as this train crosses in Konkan Railway  route,there is a speed restrictions in this route.It covers the distance of 1812 kilometres in 30 hours 57 mins as 12202 Kochuveli Lokmanya Tilak Terminus Garib Rath Express& in 30 hours 27 mins as 12201 Lokmanya Tilak Terminus Kochuveli Garib Rath Express. However, monsoon time table refers w.e.f 10 June to 31 October .

The speed calculation however does not take into account the inflation of distance (approximately 40%) on the Konkan Railway network.

As the average speed of the train is above , as per Indian Railways rules, its fare includes a superfast surcharge.

Routeing
The 12202 / 01 Kochuveli Lokmanya Tilak Terminus Garib Rath Express runs from Kochuveli, Kollam Junction, Kayamkulam Jn, Chengannur, Tiruvalla, Kottayam, Ernakulam Town, Thrissur, Shoranur Junction, Kozhikode, Kannur, Mangalore Junction, Udupi,  Karwar, Madgaon, Ratngiri, Panvel, Thane to Lokmanya Tilak Terminus.

Traction

As Konkan railway is fully electrified,an end to end WAP-7 or WAP-4 electric locomotive is attached from LTT to KCVL .

See also
List of trains run by Indian Railways
Duronto Express

References

External links

Rail transport in Maharashtra
Rail transport in Goa
Rail transport in Karnataka
Rail transport in Kerala
Garib Rath Express trains
Railway services introduced in 2008
Konkan Railway
Thiruvananthapuram railway division
Transport in Mumbai